Adalbert Rethi (6 May 1943, Târgu Mureș - 14 October 2008, Hungary) was an ethnic Hungarian table tennis player from Romania.

While playing for Dinamo Târgu Mureș he was discovered by Farkas Paneth, who took him to CSM Cluj. His first international success was at the 1959 Youth Table Tennis European Championship, where he won the doubles competition with Radu Negulescu. At the 1962 Youth European Championship he won a silver medal in the doubles competition, and a bronze in the singles competition.

In the national championships he won 16 titles, among them three in the singles competition four in the doubles with Radu Negulescu, one in the mixed with Eleonora Mihalcă and the rest as a team member of CSM Cluj (alongside Dorin Giurgiuca, Radu Negulescu, etc.), a team with which he won five European Club Cup Championships. Between 1959 and 1967 he participated in five World Table Tennis Championships and several Table Tennis European Championships.

Private 
Adalbert Rethi was the son of an officer's family. After high school, he studied law at the Babeș-Bolyai University in Cluj, and became a lawyer. In 1972 he married his first wife and emigrated to Hungary, to Cegléd. Later he married a second time. In 2008 he died after a long illness, leaving behind two children.

Awards
Master of Sports, 1964

Results from the ITTF-databank

References 
 Prof. Dr. med Radu Negulescu: In Memoriam - Adalbert Rethy, Swaythling Club International News Nr. 86, March 2009, p. 14 Online (accessed 8 March 2012) (PDF; 1,8 MB)

External links 
 Obituary (Romanian) (accessed 8 March 2012)
 

1943 births
2008 deaths
Romanian male table tennis players
Romanian sportspeople of Hungarian descent
Romanian expatriate sportspeople in Hungary
Sportspeople from Târgu Mureș